Poonchola is a village in Kanjirapuzha Panchayath, Palakkad district, Kerala, India.

References

Villages in Palakkad district